AutoHotkey is a free and open-source custom scripting language for Microsoft Windows, initially aimed at providing easy keyboard shortcuts or hotkeys, fast macro-creation and software automation that allows users of most levels of computer skill to automate repetitive tasks in any Windows application. User interfaces can easily be extended or modified by AutoHotkey (for example, overriding the default Windows control key commands with their Emacs equivalents). The AutoHotkey installation includes its own extensive help file, and web-based documentation is also available.

Features
AutoHotkey scripts can be used to launch programs, open documents, and emulate keystrokes or mouse clicks and movements. AutoHotkey scripts can also assign, retrieve, and manipulate variables, run loops and manipulate windows, files, and folders. These commands can be triggered by a hotkey, such as a script that would open an internet browser whenever the user presses  on the keyboard. Keyboard keys can also be remapped or disabled, such that pressing , for example, might result in the active window receiving an em dash  or nothing at all. AutoHotkey also allows for "hotstrings" that will automatically replace certain text as it is typed, such as assigning the string "btw" to produce the text "by the way" when typed, or the text "%o" to produce "percentage of". Further, scripts can be initiated automatically at computer startup and need not interact with the keyboard at all, perhaps performing file manipulation at a set interval.

More complex tasks can be achieved with custom data entry forms (GUI windows), working with the system registry, or using the Windows API by calling functions from DLLs. The scripts can be compiled into an executable file that can be run on other computers that do not have AutoHotkey installed. The source code is in C++ and can be compiled with Visual Studio Express.

Memory access through pointers is allowed just as in C.

Some uses for AutoHotkey:
 Remapping the keyboard, such as from QWERTY to Dvorak or other alternative keyboard layouts.
 Using shortcuts to fill in frequently-used file names or other phrases.
 Typing punctuation not provided on the keyboard, such as curved quotes (“…”).
 Typing other non-keyboard characters such as the sign  used, e.g., in describing a room as 10′×12′.
 Controlling the mouse cursor with a keyboard or joystick.
 Opening programs, documents, and websites with simple keystrokes.
 Adding a signature to e-mail, message boards, etc.
 Monitoring a system and automatically closing unwanted programs.
 Scheduling an automatic reminder, system scan, or backup.
 Automating repetitive tasks.
 Filling out forms automatically.
 Prototyping before implementing in another, more time-consuming, programming language.

History
The first public beta of AutoHotkey was released on November 10, 2003,  after author Chris Mallett's proposal to integrate hotkey support into AutoIt v2 failed to generate response from the AutoIt community. Mallett built a new program from scratch basing the syntax on AutoIt v2 and using AutoIt v3 for some commands and the compiler. Later, AutoIt v3 switched from GPL to closed source because of "other projects repeatedly taking AutoIt code" and "setting themselves up as competitors". 

In 2010, AutoHotkey v1.1 (originally called AutoHotkey_L) became the platform for ongoing development of AutoHotkey. In late 2012, it became the official branch. Another port of the program is AutoHotkey.dll. A well known fork of the program is AutoHotkey_H, which has its own subforum on the main site.

Version 2
In July 2021, the first AutoHotkey v2 beta was released. The first release candidate was released on November 20th 2022 with the full release of v2.0.0 planned later in the year.
On December 20th 2022, version 2.0.0 was officially released. On January 22nd 2023, AutoHotkey v2 became the official primary version.  AutoHotkey v1.1 became legacy and no new features will be implemented, but will still be supported by the site and maintenance releases are possible.

Examples
The following script will allow a user to search for a particular word or phrase using Google. After copying text from any application to the clipboard, pressing the configurable hotkey  will open the user's default web browser and perform the search.

#g::Run http://www.google.com/search?q=%clipboard%

The following script defines a hotstring that enables the user to type "afaik" in any program and have it automatically replaced with "as far as I know":

::afaik::as far as I know

User-contributed features 

There are extensions/interops/inline script libraries available for usage with/from other programming languages:

 VB/C# (.NET)
 Lua
 Lisp
 ECL
 Embedded machine code
 VBScript/JScript (Windows Scripting Host)

Other major plugins enable support for:

 Aspect-oriented programming
 Function hooks
 COM wrappers
 Console interaction
 Dynamic code generation
 HIDs
 Internet Explorer automation
 GUI creation
 Synthetic programming
 Web services
 Windows event hooks

Malware
When AutoHotkey is used to make self-contained software for distribution, that software must include the part of AutoHotkey itself that understands and executes AutoHotkey scripts, as it is an interpreted language. Inevitably, some malware has been written using AutoHotkey. When anti-malware products attempt to earmark items of malware that have been programmed using AutoHotkey, they sometimes falsely identify AutoHotkey as the culprit rather than the actual malware.

See also

 AutoIt (for Windows)
 AutoKey (for Linux)
 Automator (for Macintosh)
 Bookmarklet (for web browsers)
 iMacros (for Firefox, Chrome, and Internet Explorer)
 Keyboard Maestro (for Macintosh)
 KiXtart (for Windows)
 Macro Express (for Windows)
 Winbatch (for Windows)

References

External links
 
 AutoHotkey Foundation LLC

Automation software
Free system software
Free software programmed in C++
Windows-only free software